Victor Andreevitch Gresev (born Leningrad, now Saint Petersburg, 31 March 1986) is a Russian rugby union player who plays as a number eight.

He played for Slava Moscow (2006-2008), and for VVA Saracens (2009-2011), where he won the Russian Championship, in 2006, 2007, 2008 and 2009. He signed for London Wasps, where he stayed for 2011/12. Afterwards, he returned to Russia, joining Krasny Yar Krasnoyarsk, in 2012, where he plays since then. He won twice the Russian Championship, in 2013 and 2015, and twice the Cup of Russia, in 2013 and 2015.

He has 97 caps for Russia, since 2006, with 19 tries scored, 95 points on aggregate. He was called for the 2011 Rugby World Cup, playing in four games, one as substitute, and without scoring.

He was also a regular player for Russia national rugby sevens team, being twice European Champion, in 2007 and 2009.

References

External links
Victor Gresev International Statistics

1986 births
Living people
Russian rugby union players
Russia international rugby union players
VVA Podmoskovye players
Wasps RFC players
Sportspeople from Saint Petersburg
Rugby union number eights
Lokomotiv Penza players